Arzew is a district in Oran Province, Algeria, on the Mediterranean Sea. It was named after its capital, Arzew.

Municipalities
The district is further divided into 2 municipalities:
Arzew
Sidi Ben Yebka

Districts of Oran Province